Faustino Dettler (born 11 June 1998) is an Argentine professional footballer who plays as a forward for OF Ierapetra in Greece.

Career
Dettler started off in the youth set-up of Patronato. He was moved into the club's senior squad in March 2019, initially appearing as an unused substitute for a Copa Argentina win over Dock Sud on 13 March. He made his professional bow on 30 March in the Primera División against Godoy Cruz, coming off the bench on sixty-two minutes before scoring one minute later with his first touch; though Patronato went on to lose 2–1.

In January 2022, Dettler moved to Super League Greece 2 club OF Ierapetra.

Career statistics
.

References

External links

1998 births
Living people
Argentine footballers
Argentine expatriate footballers
People from Paraná, Entre Ríos
Association football forwards
Club Atlético Patronato footballers
O.F. Ierapetra F.C. players
Argentine Primera División players
Super League Greece 2 players
Argentine expatriate sportspeople in Greece
Expatriate footballers in Greece
Sportspeople from Entre Ríos Province
Argentine people of Volga German descent